Robert Lacy is an American writer of short stories, memoirs, essays, and reviews.  He was born and raised in east Texas, and served in the United States Marines Corps from 1955 to 1959.  He received his Bachelor of Journalism degree from the University of Texas, Austin (1962) before enrolling in the Iowa Writers' Workshop at the University of Iowa, where he was a student of Richard Yates.  He earned his Master of Fine Arts degree in 1966. He taught Creative Writing in the Department of English, University of Oregon (1966–1969) and in the Department of English, Slippery Rock College (1969–1972). He left academia for journalism and briefly became a reporter and copyeditor for the Minneapolis Star Tribune. He was appointed Research Analyst and then Assistant Director of the Office of Senate Research in the Minnesota Senate (1973–1983). He resumed a journalistic career when he became a columnist and reviewer for the Minneapolis Star Tribune, 1987-1998 and also resumed a teaching career when he was an Adjunct Faculty Member in the Program of Creative and Professional Writing, University of Minnesota, 1990-1995. He has been a faculty member of the Loft Literary Center, 1989-2003. He lives in Medicine Lake, Minnesota. The short storywriter and essayist William Kittredge said of Lacy's work, The Natural Father, "Robert Lacy's stories are direct, honest, grace-filled, and useful. The Natural Father is that good thing, a book that both sweetens and illuminates our lives." Of Happy Birthday, Dear Darrell, the literary critic and cultural historian John Wilson Foster noted Lacy's humor, compassion, and attractive sauntering prose, and observed that Lacy's characters "inhabit the undramatic intervals of history, like the author's own post-World War II generation, but gods make their own importance, as the Irish poet tells us. Mostly vignettes, these first-rate stories finish with a road movie in words worth the price of admission alone. 'Three Hundred and Twenty-Six Jackrabbits' transforms an American coming-of-age expedition to Chuck Berry's Promised Land into an odyssey that redeems the vanity and reversals that compose it".

Bibliography

Books
  The Natural Father: Stories (Minneapolis: New Rivers Press, 1997), 
 I Remember Highway 80 (Nacogdoches, Texas: Stephen F. Austin State University Press, 2017), 
 Happy Birthday, Dear Darrell and Other Stories (Nacogdoches, Texas: Stephen F. Austin State University Press, 2019),

Short stories
Lacy has published over thirty short stories, beginning his career as a short storywriter with "Win a Few, Lose a Few" in The Saturday Evening Post (December 18, 1965). The magazines and journals in which his stories have appeared include Crazyhorse, Ploughshares, Antioch Review, North Dakota Quarterly, South Dakota Review, Beloit Fiction Journal, Carolina Quarterly, Indiana Review, and Chariton Review. Some stories, including "The Natural Father" and "Everyone Asked About You", have proven to be favorites that have been reprinted in newspapers and anthologies. Among those anthologies have been The Best American Short Stories 1988 (Houghton Mifflin Co., 1988), Stiller's Pond: New Fiction from the Upper Midwest (New Rivers Press, 1988, 1991), and The Best of Crazyhorse: Thirty Years of Poetry and Fiction (University of Arkansas Press, 1990).

Essays and Memoirs 

Since 1995, Robert Lacy has published almost sixty essays and short memoirs in such journals and magazines as America West Magazine, Shenandoah, Virginia Quarterly Review, Southern Review, and The American Interest. Some essays have been recognized as a "Notable Essay" by Robert Atwan, ed. Best American Essays: "Arguing with Martin Luther King" (in 2001), "A Season in the Dismal Trade" (2003), "The House on Brown Street" (2004), "Sing a Song of Sunny" (2005), "Ulysses? We Don't Got to Read No Stinkin' Ulysses" (2008), "Four of a Kind" (2012), "Saturdays at the Paramount" (2013), "On the Dangers of Hero Worship" (2014). Twenty-six pieces have appeared in Sewanee Review. Short memoirs or critical essays on fellow writers are especially notable, including "Remembering Richard Yates", North Stone Review, 1995; "Richard Yates in Iowa", Sewanee Review, 2010; "Verlin" (R.V. Cassill), Sewanee Review, 2006; "The 'Bishop' Stories of Donald Barthelme", Sewanee Review, 2008; "Joan Didion: A Daughter of Old California", Sewanee Review, 2014; "Raymond Carver as a Poet", Sewanee Review, 2016; "In Memoriam: Bill Harrison [William Neal Harrison from Texas], Author of Rollerball", Sewanee Review, 2016. I Remember Highway 80 (2017) is Lacy's booklength memoir of his own boyhood, at once closely observed and poignant, with the relationship between the future author and his young widowed mother Sally Belle at its center.

Columns and Reviews from The Minneapolis Star Tribune
 
 
 
 
 
 
 
 
 
 
 
 Robert Lacy, (Sept 28, 1997), In short, `The Complete Stories of Bernard Malamud'., Star Tribune (Minneapolis, MN), 14F

Awards
 Loft McNight Fiction Fellowship, Minnesota, 1984 (judge: James Atlas)
 Winner, Midwest Voices Fiction Competition, 1985 (judge: Elizabeth Hardwick)
 Finalist, Drue Heinz Literature Prize, 1990 (University of Pittsburgh Press)
 Finalist, Iowa Short Fiction Award, 1991 (University of Iowa Press) 
 Minnesota Book Awards Past Finalists and Winners - 1998

References

 

Iowa Writers' Workshop alumni
American short story writers
People from Texas
Year of birth missing (living people)
Living people
United States Marines